The name V200 or V-200 may refer to:
 DB class V 200, a diesel-hydraulic locomotive used by the German railway Deutsche Bundesbahn
 ESP LTD V-200, a guitar model 
 UMS Skeldar V-200, Medium-range Vertical Take Off and Landing Unmanned Aerial Vehicle
The V-200 series of Cadillac Gage Commando armoured personnel carriers.
The Voyage 200 design of the TI-92 series calculator
The V200 is a type of Seeburg Corporation jukebox dated from 1955.  The first with solid state memory.